Laurel Hell is the sixth studio album by Japanese-American singer-songwriter Mitski, released on February 4, 2022, through Dead Oceans. Patrick Hyland produced the album, which has been characterized as a record blending synth-pop, indie pop and electronic rock styles. According to Mitski, the album title is a folk term for being trapped in thickets of laurel that grow in the southern Appalachian Mountains.

The album was preceded by the lead single "Working for the Knife" on October 5, 2021, and the second single "The Only Heartbreaker" on November 9, 2021. They were followed by two more singles: "Heat Lightning" and "Love Me More". Mitski promoted the album with the Laurel Hell Tour covering North America and Europe and running from February to November 2022.

Upon release, Laurel Hell received acclaim from music critics, who praised its lyrics and production. Commercially, the album peaked inside the top ten in territories such as Australia, Ireland, the United Kingdom, and the United States, marking Mitski's highest charting record in all of them. It was also the best-selling album in the US during the week of its release, and the first Billboard 200 top-ten album for Dead Oceans. Laurel Hell also became her first album to top the US Top Alternative and Rock Albums charts.

Background
Mitski wrote most of the album's songs before and during 2018, finishing the album during the COVID-19 lockdowns. Mitski also described the album as a "soundtrack for transformation, a map to the place where vulnerability and resilience, sorrow and delight, error and transcendence can all sit within our humanity, can all be seen as worthy of acknowledgment, and ultimately, love". She expressed that she wrote the album as she "needed love songs about real relationships that are not power struggles to be won or lost" as well as "songs that could help me forgive both others and myself. ... I needed to create this space mostly for myself where I sat in that gray area."

Composition
Laurel Hell is a synth-pop, indie pop, and electro-rock album influenced by the sounds of the 1980s. It incorporates elements of new wave, pop, disco, and dance music as well. The album was previously conceived as a punk album, then a country album, before settling on its current electronic form. Album opener "Valentine, Texas" "builds into a swelling, glam rock instrumental break, with glimmering synths and driving piano lines" as "the narrator wonders who she'll be tonight; opening the door to a new self, she hopes the mountains in the distance will help lighten the mental weight she carries." "Working for the Knife" puts a "dream pop spin on the avant-garde industrial music of the late eighties". On "Stay Soft", Mitski sings about "providing love to someone who isn't willing to give it back, retreating into a shell caused by past wounds". On "Everyone", Mitski sings of "leaving, running and abandonment" over techno beats. "The Only Heartbreaker" is an '80s new wave and Scandipop song "where Mitski grapples with feeling like she can't pull her weight in a relationship." "Heat Lightning" is a song about insomnia that resembles an R&B slow jam. "Should've Been Me" is a baroque pop song "that finds Mitski witnessing a lost love attempt to find solace in a copy of herself."

Critical reception

At Metacritic, which assigns a normalized rating out of 100 to reviews from mainstream publication, Laurel Hell received an average score of 83 out of 100, based on 26 reviews, indicating universal acclaim.
 
Paolo Ragusa at Consequence gave Laurel Hell a perfect score, describing it as the sound of "Mitski trusting herself, confidently blazing forward into the next decade of her storied career." Commenting on the hiatus Mitski took from music in the aftermath of her previous full-length Be the Cowboy, DIYs Ben Tipple said "That Laurel Hell exists only because it almost didn't gives it its power. It provides the space for her mastery of songwriting, and Patrick Hyland's understated yet orchestral production places Mitski in a realm all her own. She finds her voice in loss, an involuntary yet necessary response to throwing in the towel. But there's an ever-present tentative undercurrent, one that highlights the fragility of her return. The light at the end of the tunnel is flickering at best. You can't help but feel that it's all one broken brick away from tumbling down, which is exactly why it plays out with such delicate urgency."
 
In less favorable reviews, Steven Hyden of Uproxx described the LP as a "disappointment", saying that "Laurel Hell meanwhile is a tentative, frustrating record of half-measures trapped between musical worlds to which Mitski refuses to commit." Meanwhile, Gabrielle Sanchez of The A.V. Club said "The qualities that make Mitski great—her urgency, rawness, and stark ferocity—feel muted here". The song "The Only Heartbreaker" proved particularly divisive among critics. While David Smyth of the Evening Standard hailed it at as an "air-punching blast of Eighties-influenced synthpop" with hit potential, Pitchforks Cat Zhang cited its production as having the "effect of anonymizing her, subsuming a first-class songwriter into a tired palette."

Track listing

Notes
 "There's Nothing Left for You" was initially released digitally with the title "There's Nothing Left Here for You"

Personnel
 Mitski – keyboards, vocals
 Patrick Hyland – guitar, percussion, synthesizer; production, recording, mixing
 Elizabeth Chan – drums (tracks 3, 8, 9, 11)
 K. Marie Kim – additional keyboards (9, 11)
 Evan Marien – bass guitar (9, 11)
 Brooke Waggoner – piano (1, 3)
 Ted Jensen – mastering
 Ryan Smith – vinyl mastering
 Ebru Yildiz – photo
 Mary Banas – album design
 Corinne Ang – typeface "Resolve"

Charts

References

2022 albums
Dead Oceans albums
Mitski albums
Electronic rock albums by American artists
Electronic rock albums by Japanese artists
Synth-pop albums by American artists
Synth-pop albums by Japanese artists
Indie pop albums by American artists
Indie pop albums by Japanese artists